The 33rd Writers Guild of America Awards honored the best television, and film writers of 1980. Winners were announced in 1981.

Winners & Nominees

Film 
Winners are listed first highlighted in boldface.

Television

Special Awards

References

External links 

 WGA.org

1980
1980 film awards
1980 in American cinema
1980 in American television
1980 awards in the United States